Tarak Ben Ammar (born June 12, 1949) is a Tunisian-French film producer and distributor; the owner of French production and distribution company Quinta Communications. He is famous for his interest in artistic movies, especially when they are related to Mediterranean culture or require North African locations. His producing credits include the Franco Zeffirelli film adaptation of La Traviata and Claude Chabrol's Death Rite. On 19 May 2010, he announced a "strategic relationship" with the Weinstein Company.

Ben Ammar became well known in France at the beginning of 2004 when he decided to distribute The Passion of The Christ after everybody else declined. He appeared on television talk shows, defending the movie. He is also known as the advisor of international investor Prince Al Waleed Bin Talal Bin Abdul Aziz, and French businessman Vincent Bolloré.

He was formerly a manager of Michael Jackson's HIStory World Tour.

Early and Personal life 
Ben Ammar was born in Tunis, Tunisia; to a French Catholic mother of Corsican descent who converted to Islam, and to a Tunisian 
Muslim father. He was raised Muslim.

He is the brother of writer Hélé Béji. His aunt Wassila Ben Ammar was the First Lady of Tunisia as the wife of the first President of Tunisia, Habib Bourguiba.

Ben Ammar resides in France, with two of his three sons, Neil and Tarak Jr., and his model-singer daughter Sonia Ben Ammar, from his marriage to actress Beata ( Sonczuk) who is of Polish descent.

References

External links
Official website

1949 births
Living people
People from Tunis
Walsh School of Foreign Service alumni
Tunisian film producers
French people of Arab descent
French people of Tunisian descent
French people of Corsican descent
Tunisian people of Arab descent
Tunisian people of French descent
French Muslims
Tunisian Muslims